is a shoot 'em up arcade video game released by Taito in 1986.

External links
Daikaijū no Gyakushū Arcade History

1986 video games
Arcade video games
Arcade-only video games
Kaiju video games
Taito arcade games
Video games developed in Japan